William Robert Cox (March 14, 1901 – July 7, 1988) was an American writer. He was a prolific writer of short stories and Western and Mystery novels mainly for the pulp and paperback markets. He wrote under at least six pseudonyms: Willard d'Arcy, Mike Frederic, John Parkhill, Joel Reeve, Roger G. Spellman and Jonas Ward.

He was born in Peapack-Gladstone, New Jersey. According to his widow, Casey Collins Cox, he was writing his 81st novel, Cemetery Jones and the Tombstone Wars on the day of his death in 1988. He was 87. In addition to his widow, he was survived by a stepson, Douglas Campbell. He was the "beloved husband of Midge, Lamar, Lee, Pat and Casey,"

Published novels 

The Lusty Men (1957)
The Tycoon and the Tigress (1958 Fawcett Publications)
Hell to Pay — featuring gambler/private detective Tom Kincaid (1958 Signet Books 1st Printing)
Comanche Moon (1959)
Murder in Vegas — featuring gambler/private detective Tom Kincaid (April, 1960 Signet Books 1st Printing)
Death on Location — featuring gambler/private detective Tom Kincaid (1962 Signet Books 1st Printing)
Bigger Than Texas (1963)
The Sixth Horseman
Navajo Blood
The Gunsharp (1965)
Black Silver (1967, an original novel based on the TV series Bonanza)
Day of the Gun (1967)
Firecreek (1968, novelization of the screenplay by Calvin Clements)
Moon of Cobre (1969)

References

External links 
William R. Cox author profile Piccadilly Publishing

Guide to the William R. Cox papers at the University of Oregon
 

1901 births
1988 deaths
20th-century American novelists
American male novelists
American mystery writers
People from Peapack-Gladstone, New Jersey
Western (genre) writers
American male short story writers
20th-century American short story writers
20th-century American male writers